Tarantula is the fourth studio album by British rock band Ride, released in March 1996 shortly after the band split.  The album was deleted from Creation Records' catalogue only one week after its release.

This is also the only Ride album on which Andy Bell's vocal duties outweigh those of regular frontman Mark Gardener, due to internal conflict and the prior of their breakup.

Track listing

References

External links

Tarantula at YouTube (streamed copy where licensed)

Ride (band) albums
1996 albums
Creation Records albums